Eupithecia particeps is a moth in the family Geometridae. It is found in Nepal and Pakistan.

Taxonomy
It was formerly listed as a synonym of Eupithecia lobbichlerata, but reinstated as a species in 2008.

References

Moths described in 1988
particeps
Moths of Asia